The Hillsborough Stakes is a Grade II American Thoroughbred horse race for fillies and mares that are four years old or older, over a distance of  miles on turf, held annually in March at Tampa Bay Downs racetrack in Oldsmar, Florida. The purse is currently $225,000.

History

The event was inaugurated on 21 March 1999 at a distance of  miles with conditions for fillies and mares three-year-old and older and was won by the 7-10 odds-on favorite Pleasant Temper who was ridden by US Hall of Fame jockey Pat Day in a time of 1:42.62.

In 2004 the distance of the event was increased to  miles (9 furlongs). That same year the event was upgraded to Grade III.

The event was upgraded to Grade II status in 2016.

The winner of the 2012 Hillsborough, Zagora, won the Breeders' Cup Filly and Mare Turf and was voted an Eclipse Award in her category. Tepin, a two-time Eclipse Award winner, set a new course record when winning the race in 2016.

Records
Speed record:
 miles  – 1:46.26 Tepin (2016)  
 miles  – 1:41.14  Strait From Texas  (2003)  

Margins:
 lengths – Dreaming of Anna (2008)

Most wins:
 No horse has won this race more than once.

Most wins by an owner:
 2 – Godolphin Racing (2017, 2021)
 2 – Madakat Stables (2019, 2023)
 2 – Michael Dubb (2018, 2023)

Most wins by a jockey:
 3 – John Velazquez (2006, 2007, 2015)
 
Most wins by a trainer:
 6 – Chad C. Brown (2012, 2015, 2018, 2019, 2022, 2023)

Winners

See also
List of American and Canadian Graded races

External sites
Tampa Bay Downs Media Guide 2021

References

Graded stakes races in the United States
Horse races in Florida
Mile category horse races for fillies and mares
Recurring sporting events established in 1999
Sports competitions in Tampa, Florida
1999 establishments in Florida
Grade 2 stakes races in the United States